Morden Cemetery, also known as Battersea New Cemetery, is a cemetery in the Lower Morden area of the town of Morden within the London Borough of Merton, London, England. It opened on 17 March 1891. A crematorium in Morden Cemetery, North East Surrey Crematorium, is located near an area of the cemetery called the Gardens of Remembrance. The crematorium opened in 1958.

History 
In February 1889, the Battersea Burial Board made a proposal to the British government to allow them to purchase the 127-acre (51 ha) Hobald's Farm where Morden Cemetery would be built. In December, then-Home Secretary Henry Matthews, 1st Viscount Llandaff approved the purchase. Morden Cemetery opened on 17 March 1891. In 1958, a crematorium, North East Surrey Crematorium, opened in the cemetery.

Notable burials 
Notable burials at Morden Cemetery include:
Charles W. Crawford (1873–1934), British Royal Navy officer

In addition, the cemetery also contains the war graves of 287 Commonwealth service personnel from World War I and World War II.

References

External links 
Official website of the North East Surrey Crematorium

Cemeteries in London
1891 establishments in England